Erlon de Souza Silva (born 23 June 1991) is a Brazilian sprint canoeist who competes in the 1000 m doubles event (C-2). He placed tenth at the 2012 Olympics and won a silver medal at the 2016 Rio Games. He won two more silver medals at the 2011 and 2015 Pan American Games and became a world champion in 2015.

Career 
In 2014, de Souza Silva won a World Championship bronze medal in the men's C2 200 m with Isaquias Queiroz.  A year later, that team won World Championship gold in the C2 1000 m.  

This team also won a silver medal at the 2016 Olympics in the C2 1000 m.

At the following World Championships, the team were unable to defend their title, finishing in 4th place in the final.  In 2018, Silva and Queiroz won World Championship gold again, this time in the C2 500 m.

In 2019, the team won World Championship bronze, this time at the C2 1000 m.

A hip injury prevented Silva from attending the 2020 Summer Olympics, forcing Jacky Godmann to take his place as Queiroz's partner.

Personal life 
Silva took up canoeing aged 14 in his native Ubatã, but later moved to Rio de Janeiro and São Paulo. He is married to Rosangela.

References

External links

Brazilian male canoeists
1991 births
Living people
Olympic canoeists of Brazil
Canoeists at the 2012 Summer Olympics
Canoeists at the 2016 Summer Olympics
Canoeists at the 2015 Pan American Games
Pan American Games silver medalists for Brazil
Medalists at the 2016 Summer Olympics
Olympic silver medalists for Brazil
Olympic medalists in canoeing
Pan American Games medalists in canoeing
South American Games gold medalists for Brazil
South American Games medalists in canoeing
ICF Canoe Sprint World Championships medalists in Canadian
Competitors at the 2010 South American Games
Medalists at the 2011 Pan American Games
Medalists at the 2015 Pan American Games
21st-century Brazilian people